MAXX Factor is the barbershop quartet that won the Sweet Adelines International Quartet Championship for 2011 on October 22, 2010, in Seattle, Washington. SAI, "one of the world's largest singing organizations for women", has members over five continents who belong to more than 1,200 quartets. The quartet competed with seven other a cappella groups in the first season of The Sing-Off reality television show in December 2009, before being eliminated in the third of four episodes. MAXX Factor won the 2009 Mid-Atlantic Harmony Sweepstakes qualifying them to compete in the 2009 National Harmony Sweepstakes, which they won. 
All MAXX Factor members sing with The Coronet Club in their annual show at Sweet Adelines International Convention.

Discography
MAXX Sixx Pack (CD; 2009)
MAXX Factor (CD; 2011)
MAXX OUT (CD; 2015)

References

External links
 Official website

Professional a cappella groups
Barbershop quartets
Sweet Adelines International
American vocal groups